Edward Stillings (July 9, 1823 – February 20, 1890) was an American lawyer, politician, judge, and businessman.

Early life
Edward Stillings was born in Havre de Grace, Maryland in the early 19th century.  He was the son of James Stillings and Mary Barnes, a descendant of Sir George Barne III. His parents descended from English immigrants of the colonial era who participated in the American Revolution as intelligence operatives, among other activities.  His father James would serve in the War of 1812.

His parents were planters and slaveholders.  However, the institution of slavery never appealed to them, and they freed their slaves. They moved west to Springfield, Ohio in 1828, before settling in Union County, Ohio in 1834, on  that his father had purchased.  James would be a trustee of Allen Township in Union County in 1841 and 1847.

Edward was raised in a Christian home and was well-educated as a young man, going on to graduate from Augusta College in Kentucky, studying the classics and mastering the Greek language.  Edward decided he wanted to pursue law as a profession, and would ride his horse to Massachusetts to enroll in the Law Department at Harvard University.  After receiving his law degree, he returned to Ohio, clerking for Judge Cole in Marysville, Ohio before establishing his own practice after being admitted to the bar in Cincinnati in April 1846.

Marriage and family
Edward married Mary Smith on December 29, 1851  One of their sons, Vinton, was born in 1852.  Mary was the granddaughter of Lt. Col. Cyrus Smith, who served under General Hull during the War of 1812 and for whom Edward had known from Maryland.  Vinton was educated at the Phillips Exeter Academy in New Hampshire where he was class president in 1874.  However, he was educated at the University of Heidelberg in Germany after lacking interest to attend Yale as Exeter had prepared him for.  He eventually became a State Senator in Kansas in 1904 and served many terms.

Edward's wife Mary died in July 1894, four years after Edward died in 1890.

Political and legal career
Stillings became involved in politics soon after returning to Ohio, first as a member of the Whig Party, and eventually an original member of the Republican Party.  In 1851 he was elected to the Kenton City Council and later to the Ohio General Assembly as a Republican representative.  Notable legislation while there included Edward authoring the first turnpike law in Ohio history.

With the outbreak of the American Civil War, many of Edward's relatives would serve on the Union side.  He was appointed to the Military Committee of Hardin County, by the Governor William Dennison, Jr. in 1861.  Shortly thereafter, a friend of Edward's he knew earlier in life from Kenton, Ohio, Thomas Carney, had become the Governor of Kansas.  At his request to come to Kansas to help forge the infant state ahead, Edward accepted.

Kansas
Edward arrived in Leavenworth, Kansas in 1863.  He was appointed city attorney of Leavenworth by the Carney administration.  He would also be active in the business world, operating wagon trains across Kansas to forward goods to California and helping to construct the Kansas Central Railway.  He would serve as the attorney for the First National Bank in Leavenworth, Kansas Central Railroad, Leavenworth and Atchison Railroad, and many other corporations in Kansas.  A notable client also included Brigham Young of Salt Lake City.

He would be elected several times to the Kansas Legislature, where he was at one time the Chairman of the Judiciary Committee and would serve as a Judge pro tem of the District Court. In 1877 as Chairman of the Judiciary Committee, he would create the positions of three commissioners to codify the laws of the state, in which he would be appointed to one of those positions.  Having a wealth of knowledge of the Ohio code from his days in the legislature there, much of the Kansas code would be copied from Ohio's.  Stillings would argue many cases before the Supreme Court of the United States. He was considered one of the preeminent jurists in Kansas of that time.

The Edward Stillings House at 303 N. Esplanade, in the North Esplanade Historic District of Leavenworth, is listed among the National Register of Historic Places.

Notes

References
History of Union County.  Union County Historical Society. Heritage Pursuit. Unknown. 22 dec 2008
Connelley, William Elsey. " A Standard History of Kansas and Kansans." Lewis. 1918. 22 dec 2008
"Proceedings ... Annual Meeting." State Convention, Bar Association of the State of Kansas, Kansas. Bar Association of the State of Kansas. 1890. 22 dec 2008.
"Vinton Stillings." Access Genealogy. Unknown. 22 dec 2008
Civil War Soldiers and Sailors. National Park Service. Unknown. 22 dec 2008
Moore, Henry Miles.  "Early History of Leavenworth City and County." Sam Dodsworth Book Co. 1906. 22 dec 2008
Nomination Form.  National Register of Historic Places. 1973. 22 dec 2008
History of Hardin County.  Hardin County Historical Society. Heritage Pursuit. Unknown.  22 dec 2008

1823 births
1890 deaths
Politicians from Leavenworth, Kansas
Members of the Kansas House of Representatives
Members of the Ohio General Assembly
Phillips Exeter Academy alumni
Harvard Law School alumni
Ohio Whigs
19th-century American politicians
Ohio Republicans
Kansas Republicans
People from Havre de Grace, Maryland
19th-century American lawyers